Good Life is the second studio album by the dancehall artist Collie Buddz. It was released on May 19, 2017 via Harper Digital Entertainment. It features guest appearances from Jody Highroller, Kat Dahlia, Kreesha Turner, P-Lo and Snoop Dogg. The album peaked at number 1 on the US Billboard Reggae Albums chart and number 29 on the Independent Albums chart.

Track listing

Chart history

References

External links 
 Good Life by Collie Buddz on Bandcamp
 Good Life by Collie Buddz on ITunes

2017 albums
Collie Buddz albums